Miss Finland is a champion Australian Thoroughbred racehorse. She is a bay mare sired by Redoute's Choice out of Forest Pearl, who was a daughter of The Oaks winner Moonshell.

Miss Finland was trained by top South Australian trainer David Hayes. At the age of two years, she won the AAMI Golden Slipper, the world's richest juvenile race, which is run over 1,200 metres, and ran second in the Blue Diamond Stakes. As a three-year-old, her stellar form continued, which saw her win the Crown VRC Oaks, run over 2,500 metres at Flemington during the Melbourne Cup Carnival, as well as further Group One wins in the Thousand Guineas, Australian Guineas and Arrowfield Stud Stakes. She resumed as a four-year-old with a win in the Memsie Stakes, which was to be her only win in nine starts that season before retirement.
 
She comes from the Northern Dancer sire line and has a double cross of him in the fourth generation of her pedigree.

Miss Finland was named the "SPORTSMAN 2006 Horse of the Year".

Miss Finland is now residing at Arrowfield Stud.

References

 Miss Finland's racing record

2003 racehorse births
Racehorses bred in Australia
Racehorses trained in Australia
Thoroughbred family 1-s